Nebria cameroni is a species of ground beetle from Nebriinae subfamily that can be found in Nepal and Uttar Pradesh province of India.

References

cameroni
Beetles described in 1925
Beetles of Asia